Skadar is a village located in Osečina Municipality, Kolubara District, Serbia.

References

Populated places in Serbia